Martin Heinze (born 28 February 1983) is a Danish professional football midfielder, who currently plays for Deportivo Montecristo.

References

External links
National team profile
Career statistics at Danmarks Radio

1983 births
Living people
Danish men's footballers
Esbjerg fB players
AC Horsens players
Akademisk Boldklub players
KFUM Roskilde players
Association football midfielders
FA 2000 players
Denmark youth international footballers
BK Skjold players